The Law Commission of India is an executive body established by an order of the Government of India. The commission's function is to research and advise the government on legal reform, and is composed of legal experts, and headed by a retired judge. The commission is established for a fixed tenure and works as an advisory body to the Ministry of Law and Justice.

The first Law Commission was established during colonial rule in India by the East India Company under the Charter Act of 1833 and was presided by Lord Macaulay. After that, three more commissions were established in pre-independent India. The first Law Commission of independent India was established in 1955 for a three-year term. Since then, twenty-one more commissions have been established. The last chairman of the Law Commission was retired Supreme Court judge Justice B.S. Chauhan, who completed his tenure on 31 August 2018. Subsequently, the commission has not been reconstituted. In February 2020, the Government of India announced its intention to reconstitute the commission, and the Supreme Court of India is currently hearing a petition challenging the delay in appointing members to the 22nd Law Commission. On November 7, 2022, Justice Rituraj Awasthi (Former Chief Justice of Karnataka HC) was appointed as the chairperson of the 22nd Law Commission and Justice KT Sankaran, Prof. Anand Paliwal, Prof. DP Verma, Prof.(Dr) Raka Arya and Shri M. Karunanithi as members of the commission.

Evolution of Law Commission in India

The origin of the first Law Commission of India lies in the diverse and often conflicting laws prevailing in the local regions and those administered by the East India Company, which was granted royal charters and also conferred powers by the various Indian rulers to administer and oversee the conduct of the inhabitants in the local areas where the company exercised control. During this period of administration by the company, two sets of laws operated in the areas; one which applied to and in relation to British citizens and the second which applied to the local inhabitants and aliens. This was considered as a major stumbling block for proper administration by the British government during the times which is now known as the British Raj. In order to improve the law-and-order situation and also to ensure uniformity of legal administration, various options were looked for. Until then the British government had been passing various enactments to deal with particular situations, such as the Prohibition of Sati in (1829) by Lord William Bentinck under the influence of Raja Ram Mohan Roy. However, it was for the first time in (1833) that the idea to establish a Law Commission for a comprehensive examination of the existing legal system prevailing in the British administered areas and its overhaul was instituted.

Pre-Independence Law Commissions of India
The first Law Commission was established in 1834 by the British government under the chairmanship of Lord Macaulay. It suggested various enactments to the British government, most of which were passed and enacted and are still in force in India. Few of the most important recommendations made by this first Law Commission were those on the Indian Penal Code (first submitted in 1837 but enacted in 1860 and still in force), Criminal Procedure Code (enacted in 1898, repealed and succeeded by the Criminal Procedure Code of 1973), etc. Thereafter three more Law Commissions were established which made a number of other recommendations the Indian Evidence Act (1872) and Indian Contract Act (1872), etc. being some of the significant ones. The contribution of these Law Commissions can be enumerated as under.

A two-member Viceroy's Executive Council (composed of Sir Henry Maine and Sir James Fitzjames Stephen) also worked on the side-lines of the Law Commissions and ensured the passage of the following noteworthy laws;

 1863 - Religious Endowments Act
 1864 - Official Trustees Act
 1865 - Carriers Act
 1865 - Parsi Marriage and Divorce Act
 1865 - Parsi Intestate Succession Act
 1866 - Indian Companies Act
 1866 - Native Converts Marriage Dissolution Act
 1866 – Trustees Act
 1866 – Trustees and Mortgage Powers Act
 1867 – Press and Registration of Books Act
 1868 – General Clauses Act
 1869 – Divorce Act
 1870 – Court Fees Act
 1870 – Land Acquisition Act
 1870 – Female Infanticide Act
 1870 – Female Infanticide Prevention Act
 1870 – Hindu Wills Act
 1872 – Code of Criminal Procedure (revised)
 1872 – Indian Contract Act
 1872 – Indian Evidence Act
 1872 – Special Marriages Act
 1872 – Punjab Laws Act

Law Commissions in Independent India
The tradition of pursuing law reform through the medium of a law commission was continued in post-independent India. The first law commission in independent India was established in 1955 and since then twenty more law commissions have been established. Each of these commissions have been chaired by a prominent legal personality in India and has made a significant contribution to the legal diaspora of India. The contribution of each of these commissions has been enumerated below.

First Law Commission
The First Law Commission of independent India was established in 1955. The chairman of this commission was M. C. Setalvad, who was also the first attorney-general of India. The term of this commission was established as three years (which by convention has been followed till date) and this commission submitted its last report on 26 September 1958. The reports submitted by the First Law Commission of India are as under.

Second Law Commission
The Second Law Commission was established in 1958 under the chairmanship of Justice T. V. Venkatarama Aiyar. It stayed in office till 1961. It presented the following reports.

Third Law Commission
The Third Law Commission was established in 1961 under the chairmanship of Justice J. L. Kapur. It stayed in office till 1964. It presented the following reports.

Fourth Law Commission
The Fourth Law Commission was established in 1964 and was again under the chairmanship of Justice J. L. Kapur. It stayed in office till 1968. It presented the following reports.

Fifth Law Commission
The Fifth Law Commission was established in 1968 under the chairmanship of K. V. K. Sundaram. It stayed in office till 1971. It presented the following reports.

Sixth Law Commission
The Sixth Law Commission was established in 1971 under the chairmanship of Justice P. B. Gajendragadkar. It stayed in office till 1974. It presented the following reports.

Seventh Law Commission
The Seventh Law Commission was established in 1974 again under the chairmanship of Justice P. B. Gajendragadkar. It stayed in office till 1977. It presented the following reports.

Eighth Law Commission
The Eighth Law Commission was established in 1977 under the chairmanship of Justice H. R. Khanna. It stayed in office till 1979. It presented the following reports.

Ninth Law Commission
The Ninth Law Commission was established in 1979 under the chairmanship of Justice P. V. Dixit. It stayed in office till 1980. It presented the following reports.

Tenth Law Commission
The Tenth Law Commission was established in 1981 under the chairmanship of Justice K. K. Mathew. It stayed in office till 1985. It presented the following reports.

Eleventh Law Commission
The Eleventh Law Commission was established in 1985 under the chairmanship of Justice D. A. Desai. It stayed in office till 1988. It presented the following reports.

Twelfth Law Commission
The Twelfth Law Commission was established in 1988 under the chairmanship of Justice Manharlal Pranlal Thakkar. It stayed in office till 1989. It presented the following reports.

Thirteenth Law Commission
The Thirteenth Law Commission was established in 1991 under the chairmanship of Justice K. N. Singh. It stayed in office till 1994. It presented the following reports.

Fourteenth Law Commission
The Fourteenth Law Commission was established in 1995 under the chairmanship of Justice K. Jayachandra Reddy. It stayed in office till 1997. It presented the following reports.

Fifteenth Law Commission
The Fifteenth Law Commission was established in 1997 under the chairmanship of Justice B. P. Jeevan Reddy. It stayed in office till 2000. It presented the following reports.

Sixteenth Law Commission
The Sixteenth Law Commission was established in 2000. For the period till 2001 Justice B. P. Jeevan Reddy continued as the chairman of the commission while in the period between 2002 and 2003 the commission worked under the chairmanship of Justice M. Jagannadha Rao. It presented the following reports.

Seventeenth Law Commission
The Seventeenth Law Commission was established in 2003 and continued to be under the chairmanship of Justice M. Jagannadha Rao. It stayed in office till 2006. It presented the following reports.

Eighteenth Law Commission
The Eighteenth Law Commission of India was established on 1 September 2006 and continued till 31 August 2009. Justice M. Jagannadha Rao continued to serve as the chairman of the commission until 28 May 2007 on which date Justice A. R. Lakshmanan was appointed as the chairman of the commission. It presented the following reports.

Nineteenth Law Commission
The nineteenth Law Commission of India's chairman was Justice P. V. Reddi, 2009–2012.

Twentieth Law Commission
The Twentieth Law Commission of India's chairman were Justice D. K. Jain from January 2013 to October 2013 and Justice A. P. Shah from November 2013 to August 2015. The Terms of Reference of the Twentieth Law Commission were as follows:-
A. 	Review/Repeal of obsolete laws:
(i) 	Identify laws which are no longer needed or relevant and can be immediately repealed. 
(ii) 	Identify laws which are not in harmony with the existing climate of economic liberalization and need change.
(iii) 	Identify laws which otherwise require changes or amendments and to make suggestions for their amendment. 
(iv) 	Consider in a wider perspective the suggestions for revision/amendment given by Expert Groups in various Ministries/Departments with a view to coordinating and harmonising them. 
(v) 	Consider references made to it by Ministries/ Departments in respect of legislation having bearing on the working of more than one Ministry/ Department.
(vi) 	Suggest suitable measures for quick redressal of citizens grievances, in the field of law. 
B.	Law and Poverty
(i) Examine the Laws which affect the poor and carry out post-audit for socio-economic legislations.
(ii) Take all such measures as may be necessary to harness law and the legal process in the service of the poor. 
C. 	Keep under review the system of judicial administration to ensure that it is responsive to the reasonable demands of the times and in particular to secure:
(i) elimination of delays, speedy clearance of arrears and reduction in costs so as to secure quick and economical disposal of cases without affecting the cardinal principle that decisions should be just and fair. 
(ii) simplification of procedure to reduce and eliminate technicalities and devices for delay so that it operates not as an end in itself but as a means of achieving justice. 
(iii) improvement of standards of all concerned with the administration of justice. 
D. 	Examine the existing laws in the light of Directive Principles of State Policy and to suggest ways of improvement and reform and also to suggest such legislations as might be necessary to implement the Directive Principles and to attain the objectives set out in the Preamble to the Constitution. 
E.	Examine the existing laws with a view for promoting gender equality and suggesting amendments thereto.
F.	Revise the Central Acts of general importance so as to simplify them and to remove anomalies, ambiguities and inequities. 
G.	Recommend to the Government measure for making the statute book up to date by repealing obsolete laws and enactments or parts thereof which have outlived their utility.
H. 	Consider and to convey to the Government its views on any subject relating to law and judicial administration that may be specifically referred to it by the Government through Ministry of Law and Justice (Department of Legal Affairs).
I.	Consider the requests for providing research to any foreign countries as may be referred to it by the Government through Ministry of Law & Justice (Department of Legal Affairs).
J.	Examine the impact of globalization on food security, unemployment and recommend measures for the protection of the interests of the marginalized.

Twenty-First Law Commission
In 2015, the Law Ministry had forwarded a list of 48 former judges of high courts and Supreme Court to the Prime Minister's Office to select the next Law Commission chairperson. The term of the 20th Law Commission ended on 30 August last year and the Union Cabinet approved creation of the 21st Law Commission on 9 September. The Law Ministry brought out a notification to create the 21st law panel on 14 September last.

One of the key issues pending before the law panel is a call on amending the Indian Penal Code amid allegations of abuse and arbitrary use of the law. The Law Ministry had urged the commission to study the usage of the provisions of Section 124A (Sedition) of the IPC.

Former Supreme Court judge Balbir Singh Chauhan was appointed chairman of the 21st Law Commission. Justice Ravi R. Tripathi, retired judge of the Gujarat High Court was appointed as Full-time Member.

On 10 June 2016, Satya Pal Jain, Additional Solicitor General of India, was appointed as part-time member of the commission.

Working of the Law Commission
The Law Commission works in close co-ordination and under the general instruction of Ministry of Law and Justice. It generally acts as the initiation point for law reform in the country. Internally, the Law Commission works in a research-oriented manner. Employing a number of research analysts (and even law students from 2007), the commission works upon the assigned agenda and primarily comes up with research based reports, often conclusive and with recommendations. The permanent members of the commission generally are responsible for framing the exact topic and reference to work upon and often takes the services of eminent law experts and jurists who are familiar with the matter under review. These experts may either work part-time with the commission or may have been requested to contribute to specific reports or issues under review.

According to the commission's website, the commission's regular staff consists of about a dozen research personnel of different ranks and varied experiences with a small group of secretarial staff looks after the administration side of the commission's operations and the internal functioning of the commission can be described as a process with the following stages;
 Initiation of projects at the commission's meetings;
 Discussion of priorities; identification of topics and assignment of preparatory work to Members;
 Adoption of methodologies for collection of data and research;
 Outlining of problems and determination of areas for reform;
 Consultations with public, professional bodies and academic institutions;
 Evaluation of responses and preparation of draft of report;
 Discussion and scrutiny of report, leading to its finalization; and
 Forwarding of report to the Ministry of Law and Justice.

Once the report is submitted to the Ministry of Law and Justice, the task of the commission ends unless it is required to rework upon identified areas of provide clarifications by the government on the report submitted. Upon receipt of the report, it is the responsible for follow-up action on the recommendations made by the commission in the report. Generally, the Ministry of Law and Justice forwards the report with its remarks to other relevant ministries in the government and seeks from them their opinion on the relevance of the recommendation and finalizes with them the manner of implementation of these recommendations. When the proposals are cleared by the various ministries and approved by the Cabinet, the Ministry of Law and Justice goes for drafting of the implementing legislation or follows the draft submitted by the Law Commission (which usually is the case) and presents the same for approval before the Parliament.

Role of Law Commission in legal reform in India
The Law Commission of India, though an ad hoc body, has been key to law reform in India. Its role has been both advisory and critical of the government's policies. The Supreme Court of India and academia have recognized the commission as pioneering and prospective. In a number of decisions, the Supreme Court has referred to the work done by the commission and followed its recommendations. The fact that the chairman of the commission is generally a retired judge of the Supreme Court has helped the prominence of the commission.

The recommendations of the commission are not binding on the government. "They are recommendations. They may be accepted or rejected. Action on the said recommendations depends on the ministries/departments, which are concerned with the subject matter of the recommendations." This has resulted in a number of important and critical recommendations not being implemented. The commission, however, has continued to work upon its assigned tasks.

The power vested in the commission to suo motu take up matters for discussion and submit recommendations has also worked well to the advantage of India's legal system. The history of the commission is replete with such recommendations which have been made in the wake of the hour and where the law has needed change. Further, the commission has been often returned to review its earlier reports in the wake of changed scenarios and the aptness of law in such situations. Euthanasia and related issues, in particular, has been one such area where the commission has been relook the situation at least three times, with the latest being its 196th report on the topic.

Besides the Law Ministry, the commission has also been requested to work upon specific issues and submit its views by the Supreme Court on various occasions. The latest in regard has been the 205th report of the commission which has been prepared in view of the Supreme Court's request for assistance in determination of "certain legal issues relating to child marriage, and the different ages at which a person is defined as a child in different laws." The report stirred a public debate in India for recommending inter alia, a reduction in marriage age of boys to be at par with girls at 18, instead of the long continuing 21 and 18 respectively.

With all its past and present works being continuously provided on the internet, the commission has also provided a firm assistance to legal research in the country. The fact that a number of its reports have been taken receptively by the various ministries and have been worked upon to change the legal scenario, is itself an indicator sufficient enough of the role of the commission in furtherance of law reform in India.

See also
 Autonomous law schools in India
 Common Law Admission Test
 Law Commission
 Law reform
 Legal Education in India
 List of law schools in India
 Ministry of Law and Justice (India)
 Supreme Court of India
 Civil Procedure Code, 1908
 Pendency of court cases in India

Notes

References
 ASIN : B0000CQY04

External links
 Official Website of the Law Commission of India
 Reports of Law Commission of India 1-50
 Reports of Law Commission of India 51–100
 Reports of Law Commission of India 101–169
 Reports of Law Commission of India 170–195
 How does Law Commission function?
 Interview of Current Chairman of Law Commission
 Ministry of Law and Justice (India)
 Law Commissions of other countries
  http://www.lawyersclubindia.com/forum/Gipsa-companies-flout-law-commission-report-flouted-in-97081.asp

Law of India
Government agencies of India
Legal organisations based in India
Law commissions
1834 establishments in India

cs:Indické právo
es:Derecho de la India